The Palazzo Pianetti or Pianetti Tesei is a Rococo palace in the town of Jesi, region of Marche, Italy; it is presently used as the Civic Museum and exhibition space for Jesi.

History
The present structure was built in 1730, based on designs of Cardolo Maria Pianetti. The elaborate interior decorations with stucco and paint depict a variety of subjects and cycles. They include frescoes on stories of the Aeneid by Placido Lazzarini, the second floor stanza was decorated by the Florentine Bandinelli.

Pinacoteca
The adjacent building houses the civic picture gallery or Pinacoteca Civica.

The most important works in the collection is a group of works by Lorenzo Lotto, completed 1512-1535 for the churches of San Francesco al Monte and San Floriano; these include the large altar-piece of the Deposition (1512); The Madonna of the Roses (1526), the three predellas of the altarpiece of St. Lucy, telling the story of her martyrdom (1532); and the Visitation (1531-35).

As well as the above-mentioned works, the gallery contains paintings by:
Cristoforo Roncalli
Carlo Cignani
Giacomo del Po
Cristoforo Unterberger
Alessandro Tiarini
Antonio Sarti
Pietro Paolo Agabiti
Giuliano Presutti
Francesco Trevisani
Carlo Maratta
Domenico Luigi Valeri
Giovanni Battista Langetti
Guercino
Gerolamo Marchesi da Cotignola
Nicola di Maestro Antonio da Ancona
Francesco Albani
Orfeo Tamburi
Renato Guttuso
Valeriano Trubbiani

External links 
Palazzo Pianetti - Comune di Jesi

Houses completed in 1730
Art museums and galleries in Marche
Pianetti
Jesi
Iesi
Rococo architecture in Italy